Gwoźnica may refer to the following places in Poland:

Gwoźnica Dolna
Gwoźnica Górna